Leipzig-Völkerschlachtdenkmal is a railway station in the city of Leipzig, Germany. The station was opened in 1968 and located on the Leipzig Hbf–Leipzig-Connewitz railway until its closure in November 2012. As part of City Tunnel network enhancements it was rebuilt thereafter a few meters northeast at the former Leipzig-Stötteritz–Leipzig-Engelsdorf section of the Leipzig Freight Ring and reopened along with Leipzig City Tunnel on 15 December 2013.

The station is served by S-Bahn Mitteldeutschland since then, train services are operated by DB Regio.

The station is located near the Monument to the Battle of the Nations.

Train services
S-Bahn Mitteldeutschland services currently call at the station.

References

External links
 
 

Volkerschlachtdenkmal
Leipzig Volkerschlacht